Nyangumarta, also written Njaŋumada, Njangamada, Njanjamarta and other variants, is a language spoken by the Nyangumarta people and other Aboriginal Australians in the region of Western Australia to the south and east of Lake Waukarlykarly, including Eighty Mile Beach, and part of the Great Sandy Desert inland to near Telfer. As of 2021 there were an estimated 240 speakers of Nyangumarta, down from a 1975 estimate of 1000.

It has two dialects: Ngurlipartu and Wanyarli. It is the most widely spoken Aboriginal language in the town of Port Hedland.

Classification
Nyangumarta is a member of the Marrngu branch of the Pama–Nyungan languages.  The other members of this group are Mangarla and Karajarri, with which it shares features and vocabulary.

Geographic distribution

Dialects
Nyangumarta has two main dialects: Ngurlipartu, spoken in the southern, inland region, and Wanyarli, spoken in the northern, coastal region.

Phonology

Nyangumarta has a typical Australian phoneme inventory, with many consonant phonemes, including multiple lateral and rhotic phonemes, but few vowel phonemes.

Consonants
There are 17 consonant phonemes in Nyangumarta, with five pairs of homorganic plosives and nasals.

There are no voicing contrasts in Nyangmurta.

Allophones of the consonants tend to vary in manner of articulation rather than place of articulation – e.g. plosives are usually voiceless word-initially, but voiced intervocalically and following nasals, and some plosives have fricative allophones.

Vowels

There are 3 contrastive vowels in Nyangmarta.

Nyangmurta does not contrast roundedness or length in vowels.

Syllable Structure

Monosyllabic words are permitted in Nyangumarta, but they must be at least bimoraic, with short vowels and consonants each counting as one mora, and long vowels as two. All words must begin with a consonant, although, if the initial consonant is a glide followed by its matching vowel [i.e. a sequence of /ji/ or /wu/] the glide may be dropped by some speakers. Additionally, word-initial consonant clusters are not permitted in this language, except when a cluster is created through a process of vowel elision.

Morphology

Words in Nyangumarta are generally sorted into two major word classes: nominals, which take marking for case and number, and verbs, which take marking for Tense, aspect, and mood. In addition to these two, there are also small closed classes of particles, exclamations, and clitics. As is typical of Pama-Nyungan languages, Nyangamurta uses suffixes to show case, person, number, TAM.

Nyangumarta has three numbers: singular, dual, and plural, with dual and plural 1st person marked for clusivity. Unusually for a language of the Pilbara region, Nyangumarta has pronominal suffixes that attach to the verb in addition to independent pronouns.

Many Nyangumarta verbs are so-called complex verbs, formed out of a "pre-verb" (usually a nominal) plus an inflected stem, which combine to form a verb with a new meaning

Some nominals are bound, and have no meaning independent of their use in complex verbs

Nyangumarta uses a split ergative system of alignment: while case marking is done on an ergative-absolutive basis, pronouns (including pronominal marking on verbs) use a nominative-accusative system

Simple verbs mostly fall into two major classes, NY-class and RN-class. The NY class is intransitive and the RN class is (mostly) transitive. There are also a few verb roots that encode a semantic distinction by alternating between the classes (e.g. jupa-NY, 'diminish' and jupa-RN, 'extinguish').

Most Nyangumarta verbs are complex verbs, or verbs formed from derivation or compounding. Nyangumarta has a causative -ma-RN, an affective -ji-RN, and a verbalizer -pi-RN which adds no particular meaning to the verb. Of these, -ma-RN and -pi-RN can only be used with a nominal.

Clause structure

Nyangumarta creates subordinate clauses through nominalization of verbs. There are fundamentally two types of subordinate clause: the purpose clause and the relative clause. Purpose causes denote why or for what purpose an action occurred, and are marked by dative marking on the nominalized verb.

Relative clauses denote either a shared time frame (T-type relative clause) or a shared argument (NP-type relative clause) between the main and subordinate clauses, and are marked by ablative marking on the nominalized verb. Additional case markers (dative, accusative, and locative) can be added on along with the ablative to produce more specific effects.

However, in many cases what is accomplished in other languages by subordination is accomplished in Nyangumarta with clause conjunction.

References

Source
Janet Catherine Sharp. (2004). Nyangumarta, A Language of the Pilbara Region of Western Australia. Canberra: Pacific Linguistics

Pama–Nyungan languages
Nyangumarta